Version Control by Example is a book about version control by Eric Sink.

References

External links 

 
 Full text of Version Control by Example in HTML
 Full text of Version Control by Example in PDF (letter)
 Full text of Version Control by Example in PDF (A4)

Version control systems
Apache Subversion
Git (software)